Alan Damián Medina Silva (born 10 April 1998) is a Uruguayan professional footballer who plays as a right winger for Liverpool Montevideo.

Career
A youth academy graduate of Liverpool Montevideo, Medina made his professional debut on 16 September 2018 in a 0–0 draw against Fénix.

Career statistics

Club

Honours
Liverpool
Torneo Intermedio: 2019
Supercopa Uruguaya: 2020

References

External links

1998 births
Living people
Liverpool F.C. (Montevideo) players
Uruguayan Primera División players
Uruguayan footballers
Association football midfielders